Grand National Films, Inc (or Grand National Pictures, Grand National Productions and Grand National Film Distributing Co.) was an American Poverty Row motion picture production-distribution company in operation from 1936 to 1939.  The company had no relation to the British Grand National Pictures (although the British firm used the American company's logo).

History and releases
Edward L. Alperson, a film exchange manager, founded Grand National in 1936 on the basis of First Division Pictures, of which he was on the board of directors. What United Artists was to major independent producers, First Division was to low-budget producers: a convenient releasing outlet for individual pictures, and successful within its own market. 

In April 1936 Alperson took over First Division's film exchanges, existing product line, and contracts, the company now functioning as Grand National Film Distributing Company. By the summer, he had begun development of a California-based production entity, Grand National Productions, at the Educational Pictures studios, to create future product. By October, he had his first original films ready for release. Alperson dreamed up the studio's logo, a futuristic clock tower, with an idea to advertise "it's time to see a Grand National release."

Producer Edward Finney, releasing through Grand National, gave the new company its first star attraction: singing cowboy Tex Ritter. The studio went on to produce other Westerns that featured singing cowboy Tex Fletcher and then singing cowgirl Dorothy Page, and made a series of mysteries with silent-screen star Rod LaRocque as the popular fiction and radio character The Shadow. Apart from westerns, its most consistent talent may have been comedy director Charles Lamont. Producer George Hirliman made a few features in a two-color process that he labeled "Hirlicolor", similar to Cinecolor. Hirliman also produced a four-film series starring his wife Eleanor Hunt and Conrad Nagel as federal agents Reynolds and O'Connor.

The studio had overseas distribution with Associated British Pictures Corporation and bought the rights to one British Boris Karloff film.

In 1937, Grand National succeeded in signing James Cagney, after he had a falling out with his home studio, Warner Bros. After making Great Guy for Grand National, Cagney was offered a gangster story, Angels with Dirty Faces, which Grand National had acquired. Cagney was worried about being typecast as a gangster, as he had been at Warner Bros., and opted instead for a musical satire on Hollywood called Something to Sing About, directed by Victor Schertzinger. The Cagney name was a huge coup for Grand National, and the company invested much more money than usual in its Cagney films, expecting a boxoffice bonanza. Despite Cagney's presence, however, neither picture turned a profit. The Cagney films were simply too expensive for the intended market: Grand National's customer base consisted of small, neighborhood movie theaters accustomed to paying cheap rentals for low-budget films. Thus Grand National was unable to recoup its investment, a key factor in the company's imminent collapse. The Angels with Dirty Faces property went to Warner Bros., as did Cagney himself.

In 1938 film executive Earle W. Hammons, president of Educational, joined forces with Grand National in an effort to expand both companies. The attempt was unsuccessful, however, and Grand National entered into liquidation in 1939. Its completed but unreleased films were sold to Universal Pictures, Columbia Pictures, and RKO Radio Pictures. The Grand National film library was split among reissue distributors, chiefly Screencraft Pictures and Astor Pictures. The Grand National physical plant was acquired by Producers Releasing Corporation (PRC).

Partial filmography 

Grand National released a total of 100 films in its three-year run.  Many of its titles have lapsed into the public domain and are legally accessible online.

 Captain Calamity (1936)
 The Devil on Horseback (1936)
 Headin' for the Rio Grande (1936)
 Lonely Road (1936)
 Great Guy (1936)
 Trailin' Trouble (1937)
 Navy Spy (1937)
 Bank Alarm (1937)
 Renfrew of the Royal Mounted (1937)
 Something to Sing About (1937)
 Swing It, Sailor! (1938)
 Here's Flash Casey (1938)
 Mr. Boggs Steps Out (1938)
 Long Shot (1939)
 Exile Express (1939)
 Isle of Destiny (1940) (bought by RKO for release)
 Half a Sinner (1940) (bought by Universal for release)
 Miracle on Main Street (1940) (bought by Columbia for release)

References

External links
 IMDb.com: Grand National Pictures (U.S.)
 IMDb.com: Grand National Films Ltd. (U.K.)

 01
Defunct film and television production companies of the United States
Film distributors of the United States
Entertainment companies based in California
Companies based in Los Angeles
American companies established in 1936
Entertainment companies established in 1936
Mass media companies established in 1936
Mass media companies disestablished in 1939
1936 establishments in California
1939 disestablishments in California
Defunct companies based in Greater Los Angeles
RKO General